Joseph Abel Romero (born September 9, 1996), is an American professional baseball pitcher for the St. Louis Cardinals of Major League Baseball (MLB). He played for the Philadelphia Phillies from 2020 to 2022.

Early life
Romero was born on September 9, 1996 in Camarillo, California, the eldest of three children. He cites his experience watching his father play in a Southern California baseball league as inspiring him to take up the sport.

Baseball career

Romero attended Oxnard High School in Oxnard, California. In 2013, as a junior, he went 10–2 with a 1.24 earned run average (ERA) along with batting .308. Romero then played college baseball at the University of Nevada and Yavapai College.

Minor leagues 
Romero was drafted by the Philadelphia Phillies in the fourth round (107th pick overall) of the 2016 Major League Baseball draft. After signing, Romero made his professional debut with the Williamsport Crosscutters. He spent the whole season there, going 2–2 with a 2.56 ERA in ten games.

In 2017, Romero played for the Lakewood BlueClaws and Clearwater Threshers. After posting a combined 10–3 (W–L) record, with a 2.16 ERA, and 128 strikeouts, he was named the Phillies’ minor league pitcher of the year. Showing a glimpse of Romero’s enormous promise, on May 10, 2017, he threw eight one-hit innings against the Greenville Drive, in a BlueClaws home victory at FirstEnergy Park.

In 2018, with the Reading Fightin Phils, Romero was 7–6 with a 3.80 ERA, with 100 strikeouts in 106.2 innings. He was selected to play in the Arizona Fall League for the Scottsdale Scorpions following the 2019 season. On November 20, 2019, Romero was added to the Phils’ 40–man roster.

Philadelphia Phillies 
On August 21, 2020, with the Phillies playing a road game in Atlanta, Romero made his big league debut. He pitched the eighth inning, with the Braves ahead 11–2. Romero struck out all three batters that he faced. Romero finished his rookie season with a 7.59 ERA in 12 appearances.

On May 19, 2021, it was announced that Romero would undergo Tommy John surgery, ending his 2021 season. In 11 games, Romero recorded a 7.00 ERA with 8 strikeouts.

St. Louis Cardinals
On July 30, 2022, Romero was traded to the Cardinals in exchange for infielder Edmundo Sosa.

References

External links

1996 births
Living people
Sportspeople from California
Baseball players from California
Major League Baseball pitchers
Philadelphia Phillies players
St. Louis Cardinals players
Nevada Wolf Pack baseball players
Yavapai Roughriders baseball players
Williamsport Crosscutters players
Lakewood BlueClaws players
Clearwater Threshers players
Reading Fightin Phils players
Lehigh Valley IronPigs players
Scottsdale Scorpions players
2023 World Baseball Classic players